Bilruta Frosta–Åsen AS is a defunct bus company based in Frosta, Norway. It operated the route from Frosta to Åsen, and onwards north to Levanger. The company was bought by TrønderBilene on 1 December 1999 from Frode Revhaug. In 2005 TrønderBilene and Bilruta Frosta–Åsen merged; at the time Bilruta had 17 employees.

References

Bus companies of Trøndelag
Fosen Trafikklag
Frosta
Companies with year of establishment missing 
Companies disestablished in 2005